First warrant officer (1WO) is a warrant officer rank in the Singapore Armed Forces. It is senior to second warrant officer but junior to master warrant officer.

First warrant officers may be given appointments such as battalion regimental sergeant major. They may serve tours as instructors, or on various staffs. As comparatively senior warrant officers, they may be given appointments normally given to commissioned officers at such as quartermaster at non-combat units or platoon commander at training units.

References

See also
 Singapore Armed Forces ranks
 Specialist (Singapore)

Military ranks of Singapore
Warrant officers